Brachyopa plena is a European species of hoverfly.

Distribution
Czech Republic.

References

Diptera of Europe
Eristalinae
Insects described in 1939
Taxa named by James Edward Collin